In multivariate statistics, if  is a vector of  random variables, and  is an -dimensional symmetric matrix, then the scalar quantity  is known as a quadratic form in .

Expectation
It can be shown that

A book treatment of the topic of quadratic forms in random variables is that of Mathai and Provost.

Proof 
Since the quadratic form is a scalar quantity, .

Next, by the cyclic property of the trace operator,

Since the trace operator is a linear combination of the components of the matrix, it therefore follows from the linearity of the expectation operator that

 

A standard property of variances then tells us that this is

 

Applying the cyclic property of the trace operator again, we get

Variance in the Gaussian case
However, if  does follow a multivariate normal distribution, the variance of the quadratic form becomes particularly tractable. Assume for the moment that  is a symmetric matrix. Then,

.

In fact, this can be generalized to find the covariance between two quadratic forms on the same  (once again,  and  must both be symmetric):

.

In addition, a quadratic form such as this follows a generalized chi-squared distribution.

Computing the variance in the non-symmetric case
Some texts incorrectly state that the above variance or covariance results hold without requiring  to be symmetric. The case for general  can be derived by noting that

so

is a quadratic form in the symmetric matrix , so the mean and variance expressions are the same, provided  is replaced by  therein.

Examples of quadratic forms
In the setting where one has a set of observations  and an operator matrix , then the  residual sum of squares can be written as a quadratic form in :

For procedures where the matrix  is symmetric and idempotent, and the errors are Gaussian with covariance matrix ,  has a chi-squared distribution with  degrees of freedom and noncentrality parameter , where

may be found by matching the first two central moments of a noncentral chi-squared random variable to the expressions given in the first two sections. If  estimates  with no bias, then the noncentrality  is zero and  follows a central chi-squared distribution.

See also
Quadratic form
Covariance matrix
Matrix representation of conic sections

References 

Statistical theory
Quadratic forms